Harald Kaas (19 May 1868 – 5 December 1953) was a Norwegian architect.

Kaas was born in Christiania (now Oslo), Norway. He studied at the Norwegian National Academy of Craft and Art Industry, then at Baugewerkschule in Eckernförde and finally at Polytechnicum in Munich.

He worked for a couple of years in the Colony of Natal   in South Africa. He was employed by the Norwegian State Railways from 1908 to 1914, and designed stations on the Arendal Line, Bergen Line and Solør Line for the company. Kaas died on 5 December 1953 and was buried on 20 May 1954 at Vår Frelsers gravlund in Oslo.

Selected works
Vestfossen Station on Sørlandsbanen (1871)
Fåberg Station on Dovrebanen (1894)
Kolbotn Station on Østfoldbanen (1895)

References

Selected works

1868 births
1953 deaths
Architects from Oslo
Norwegian expatriates in Germany
Ludwig Maximilian University of Munich alumni
Norwegian State Railways (1883–1996) people
Burials at the Cemetery of Our Saviour